The Queensland Handball League is a Brisbane based championship for handball. The Queensland Handball Association was incorporated in 1983 and the competition has been running for most years since then. The winner of this league qualifies for the Australian Handball Club Championship which is a qualifying event for the Oceania Handball Champions Cup.

Winners

See also

Australian Handball Federation
Handball League Australia

References

External links
 Handball Australia webpage
 Handball Queensland webpage
 Northern Panthers webpage
 University of Queensland webpage

Handball in Australia
Handball competitions in Australia
Sports club competitions
1983 establishments in Australia
Recurring sporting events established in 1983